The first season of Melrose Place, an American television series, premiered on Fox on July 8, 1992. The season one finale aired on May 26, 1993, after 32 episodes. 

Each episode ran approximately 45 minutes in length, with the season premiere and finale being extended to 90 minutes. Production team for the first season of the show includes Chip Hayes as producer, Charles Pratt, Jr. as co-producer, Frank South and Frederick Rappaport as supervising producers and Aaron Spelling, E. Duke Vincent and Darren Star as executive producers. 

The season was released on DVD as an eight-disc box set under the title of Melrose Place - The Complete First Season on November 7, 2006 by Paramount Home Video.

Storylines
During its first season, Melrose Place was an earnest serial drama with low-key storylines focusing on young people who come to Los Angeles to realize their dreams. The series was introduced with a crossover story from Beverly Hills, 90210 in which Kelly Taylor (Jennie Garth) pursues Melrose Place resident Jake Hanson (Grant Show), a laborer and bad-boy biker. Jake first appeared in the last two episodes of Beverly Hills, 90210s second season, while Kelly continued their storyline with appearances in the first three episodes of Melrose Place, along with Brian Austin Green as David Silver, and Ian Ziering as Steve Sanders. Tori Spelling also appears in the first two episodes as her Beverly Hills, 90210 character Donna Martin. Eventually, Jake breaks off the romance because of their age difference and his inability to commit to her. 

Michael (Thomas Calabro) and Jane Mancini (Josie Bissett) are the building's stable couple. Michael, the building superintendent, is a physician at Wilshire Memorial Hospital, and Jane is a budding fashion designer. Their neighbors are roommates Alison Parker (Courtney Thorne-Smith) and Billy Campbell (Andrew Shue). Alison is a receptionist at a local advertising firm, and Billy is a struggling writer who makes ends meet as a dance teacher, a taxi driver, a local newspaper reporter and a furniture salesman before finding a job at Escapade magazine near the end of the season. Alison and Billy later began an affair. Gay social worker Matt Fielding (Doug Savant) files a sexual-discrimination lawsuit against the halfway house at which he volunteers.

Other original cast members are aerobics instructor Rhonda Blair (Vanessa A. Williams) and her roommate, actress Sandy Louise Harling (Amy Locane), who moonlights as a waitress at Shooters, the group's hangout. Sandy was written out of the series after 13 episodes, after being discovered by a talent agent for a soap opera, with the producers admitting later that they "never knew what they wanted to do with the character". She was replaced by photographer Jo Reynolds (Daphne Zuniga), who arrives from New York to escape her alcoholic ex-husband. Jo and Jake become friends and enjoy an on-again, off-again romance.  

Faced with mediocre ratings, its producers attempted to revamp the series. Heather Locklear was introduced as Amanda Woodward, the art director at D & D Advertising, and Alison's confidante. Intended as a guest star for a four episode story arc, Locklear remained on the series throughout its run. Amanda became vice-president, having affairs with several Melrose Place residents and vying with Alison for Billy's affections. The series evolved from an episodic format to a soap opera with ongoing, interwoven stories, beginning with Michael Mancini's affair with co-worker Kimberly Shaw (Marcia Cross) and Alison's affair with a married man who begins stalking her in the season finale after she ends the relationship. The season ends with Alison and Billy becoming a couple, Michael and Jane splitting up when Jane discovers his affair with Kimberly, and Amanda's miscarriage of Billy's baby and her purchase of the building.

At the end of the season, Vanessa Williams was fired, citing the show's changes, "They didn’t invite me back for the second season. It wasn’t anything about my work, but they decided to go a different route". Her character Rhonda left the apartment complex after becoming engaged to wealthy restaurateur Terrence Haggard (John Marshall Jones).

Cast

Main cast members
In alphabetical order
 Josie Bissett as Jane Mancini
 Thomas Calabro as Michael Mancini
 Amy Locane as Sandy Harling (episodes 1–13)
 Doug Savant as Matt Fielding
 Grant Show as Jake Hanson
 Andrew Shue as Billy Campbell
 Courtney Thorne-Smith as Alison Parker
 Vanessa Williams as Rhonda Blair
 Daphne Zuniga as Jo Reynolds (episodes 15+)

Recurring guest stars

 Jennie Garth as Kelly Taylor
 Ian Ziering as Steve Sanders
 Brian Austin Green as David Silver 
 Deborah Adair as Lucy Cabot
 Salome Jens as Joan Campbell
 Marcia Cross as Dr. Kimberly Shaw
 Carmen Argenziano as Dr. Stanley Levin
 William R. Moses as Keith Gray
 Rae Dawn Chong as Carrie Fellows
 James Handy as Matt Fielding Sr.
 Claudette Nevins as Constance Fielding
 Sydney Walsh as Kay Beacon
 John Marshall Jones as Terrence Haggard
 Laura Leighton as Sydney Andrews
 Heather Locklear as Amanda Woodward 
 Wayne Tippit as Palmer Woodward
 Meg Wittner as Nancy Donner

The role of Billy Campbell was originally played by actor Stephan Fanning, who beat out Matthew Perry for the role. Days into shooting the pilot, Fanning was fired and replaced by Andrew Shue. His scenes were reshot.

Episodes

References

1992 American television seasons
1993 American television seasons